Shelterwood cutting is the progression of forest cuttings leading to the establishment of a new generation of seedlings of a particular species or group of species without planting. This silvicultural system is normally implemented in forests that are considered mature, often after several  thinnings. The desired species are usually long-lived and their seedlings would naturally tend to start under  partial shade. The shelterwood system gives enough light for the desired species to establish without giving enough light for the weeds that are adapted to full sun. Once the desired species is established, subsequent cuttings give the new seedlings more light and the growing space is fully passed to the new generation.

What separates shelterwood cuttings from other regeneration systems, such as clearcutting or seed tree, is that the new seedlings are established before the mature trees are fully (or mostly) removed. This gives the forester more control over the species that are regenerated, and is more forgiving if the first regeneration effort fails. All mature trees may be removed, creating a young even-aged forest, or a considerable number of reserves may be kept to provide a two-aged structure. Small woodlot owners often prefer this method for the control it gives and also because the income from the harvest is spread out over a decade or more.

Shelterwood systems may include preparatory cuttings, establishment cuttings, and one or more overstory removal cuttings:

Preparatory cuttings are sometimes, but not always, the first step in a shelterwood regeneration system. The purpose of this cut is to remove species that are not desired so that they do not contribute seeds to the establishment cut. If this is not a problem, the preparatory cut is not necessary. When discussing desired and undesired tree species, foresters are combining their knowledge of the landowner's preferences with their education in the ecology of the trees in their area. A landowner may prefer oaks because they produce acorns that feed wildlife, or may prefer one species over another because it has a longer lifespan and tends to occur in mature forests. Most species can be desired in one place and undesired in another depending on the landowner's goals.

Establishment cutting aims to establish the regeneration, and is done in a year when the seed crop is good. The intention is to provide a certain amount of light that is necessary for new seedlings to start, but not necessarily grow freely. In many cases the mineral soil is intentionally exposed, encouraging germination by providing a moister seedbed than the leaves and needles that normally cover the forest floor. The severity of the cut depends on the species being targeted: fewer trees are removed for species that tolerate more shade, more trees removed for species that require more light. It is important that just enough light be given to establish the desired species, without inviting undesired species that require more light.

In other situations, the undesired species is more shade tolerant than the desired species. In this case, foresters will forgo the preparatory cut (which might invite early germination of the undesired shade-tolerant) and perform a heavier than normal establishment cut, giving the desired species enough resources to establish and outgrow the undesired species. The (partial) overstory removal quickly follows, continuing to give the desired species the resources to outgrow its competitor. In the example below, the very shade tolerant balsam fir established in an earlier harvest, and is preventing the establishment of moderately shade tolerant eastern white pine.

Overstory removal or partial overstory removal is performed to give more light to the established seedlings, allowing them to grow freely. This is the most important part of the shelterwood system because the site's resources are deliberately transferred from one generation of trees to the next. Without this cutting, seedlings will stagnate or even die as the crowns of the older trees grow. All the mature trees may be removed, or some may be left as reserves. These will continue to grow and may be harvested several decades later, or may be left to die of old age and contribute ecological values to the site.

Shelterwood with reserves

Keeping the shelterwood for a longer time than just the regeneration can be called the irregular shelterwood method, delayed shelterwood method, extended shelterwood method, shelterwood with reserves or reserve shelterwood. It maybe done to get additional growth on the overwood trees to get extra-large diameters for woods for speciality purposes and products. It also enhances the scenery and is important for some biota. There may be ecological and social needs wanted at a landscape level mitigating for their retention.

Femelschlag

When this series of treatments is performed across an entire stand, it is called a uniform or regular shelterwood. Irregular shelterwoods take a variety of forms, and are becoming increasingly popular on small woodlots and public land. One variation is the Femelschlag, a German invention meaning "expanding group shelterwood with reserves." A patch of seedlings is located or established by cutting, and the mature trees surrounding this patch are cut, with the exception of several high-quality reserves. Regeneration then establishes around the edges of this new gap in response to the increased light. When this regeneration has established, the gap is expanded by cutting the trees around the edge of the gap, again leaving some reserves. The forest is regenerated in concentric circles that eventually meet, providing a diverse structure and steady income from repeated cuttings.

Shelterwood and Seed-Tree Compared

Shelterwood is very similar to seed-tree as a regeneration method. Both use natural regeneration to create an even aged stand. However, the seed-tree method is focused on very few trees that will be wind dispersed. So for example red pine 25/ha, 7/ha for larch, 15-20/ha for Douglas fir.

Whereas the shelterwood method would typically have more trees as they provide a protective aspect and may well be trees with a hard mast that do not disperse so well such as oak or beech. So if shelterwood was used you might find 49/ha for Douglas fir, mixed conifers 86/ha.

The amounts will vary according to species, site, age and health variables of the trees concerned.

This means that in shelterwood the trees will be removed at some time as part of the method, but with seed-tree methods there are so few that it is not necessary to make a cut just to remove them, they are more likely to be taken when performing a tending or thinning operation or other cut than a removal cut.

Potential problems

Any silvicultural method is more prone to certain problems than another. Shelterwood has several particular problems.

 Windthrow from poor selection of trees in relation to the local wind patterns and direction on a site. 
 Felling of trees may damage the regenerating level if not done carefully.
 Repeated cuts means repeated entry into the land with forest machinery, which can compact the soil and damage trees accidentally if not done carefully. With modern training this is substantially reduced from what was common in earlier times during the industry development.
 If variations such as strip shelterwood cutting is used a regeneration method the trees might not grow consistently after treatments creating an uneven aged stand more like a Plenterwald than the even aged stand aimed at.

See also

Patch cut

References

Forest management